Patrick Toussaint Mas (born 10 April 1959) is an Andorran alpine skier. He competed in three events at the 1980 Winter Olympics.

References

External links
 

1959 births
Living people
Andorran male alpine skiers
Olympic alpine skiers of Andorra
Alpine skiers at the 1980 Winter Olympics
Place of birth missing (living people)